is a Japanese music box and electrical component manufacturing company and a member of the Nidec Group. The company was founded as Sankyo Seiki Manufacturing in 1946; Nidec Corporation became the majority shareholder of the company in 2003. In fiscal 2013, it had a revenue of more than 9.9 billion yen (US$800 million) from the manufacture of various electronic components.

Nidec Sankyo has had a speed skating club since 1957 and two of its members, Keiichiro Nagashima and Joji Kato, won medals at the 2010 Vancouver Winter Olympics.

References

External links
 

Electronics companies of Japan